Sanming (524) is a Type 053H3 frigate of the People's Liberation Army Navy. She was commissioned on 25 December 1999.

Development and design 

The ship's anti-aircraft defense is mainly the Haihongqi-7 with short-range point defense. The foreign trade model of the missile is FM-90N, with a total length of 3 meters, a bullet diameter of 156 mm, a wingspan of 0.55 meters, a launch weight of 84.5 kg, and a maximum speed of 2.3. Mach, the shooting height is 15-5500 meters, the maximum range is 10 to 12 kilometers, the minimum range is 500 meters, and the kill probability is about 70%. It can intercept low-altitude targets with a flying height of less than 5 meters, and the system response speed is 6.5 seconds. After the modification, it was replaced with an 8-unit Haihongqi-10 near defense missile.

The quadruple Eagle Strike-83 anti-ship missile is the standard equipment of the PLA naval destroyer. It is 6.86 meters long, 1.18 meters wingspan, 0.36 meters bullet diameter, total weight 850 kg, warhead weight 165 kg, and sea skimming altitude 35 Meters, at a distance of 5 kilometers from the target, it drops to 5-7 meters from the sea, the maximum range is 150-180 kilometers, and the single shot hit rate is more than 95%.

The hangar and in front of the bridge are equipped with two 76A double-barreled 37mm anti-aircraft guns. After modification, it was replaced with two simplified versions of H/PJ-12 7-tube 30mm naval guns (fire control radar adopts centralized arrangement).

Construction and career 
Sanming was launched in December 1998 at the Hudong-Zhonghua Shipyard in Shanghai. Commissioned on 25 December 1999 into the East Sea Fleet.

On March 5, 2007, Sanming and Lianyungang formed a Chinese navy formation and arrived in Karachi, Pakistan, to participate in the "Peace-07" multinational naval exercise held in the North Arabian Sea from March 6 to 13.

Gallery

References 

1998 ships
Ships built in China
Type 053H3 frigates